Megagraphitti is the second solo studio album by American rapper Vordul Mega, one half of Cannibal Ox. It was released on Backwoodz Studioz in 2008.

Critical reception

Andrew Martin of PopMatters commented that Vordul Mega "has developed an ever-changing flow and his lyrics remain solid and consistent." Ben Westhoff of Washington City Paper wrote, "Megagraphitti proves that Mega has hit on an idea that's as good now as it was in 2001: Call it end-of-the-world movie-score rap."

Track listing

References

External links
 
 

2008 albums
Vordul Mega albums
Albums produced by El-P